Clitocybe vibecina is a common, inedible mushroom of the genus Clitocybe. It often grows in rings on needle litter, usually late in the year.

Description
The cap is umbilicated with a down turned margin, rarely funnel shaped. When moist, it is dark grey with a brownish grey center, striped and whitish grey when dry. it grows up to 5 cm in diameter. The gills are grey, rather thick and a little decurrent. The spores are white. The stem is grey to white. The flesh is watery, grey and has a rancid smell. The Latin vibicina means "with weals or welts (vibices)" and would seem to describe the slightly raised striations of the cap.

Similar species
Clitocybe ditopus is larger, with a grey cap when moist and white when dry. The ribs are absent.

References
E. Garnweidner. Mushrooms and Toadstools of Britain and Europe. Collins. 1994.

External links
 
 

vibecina
Fungi of Europe